The Azerbaijan Cup 1993-94 was the third season of the annual cup competition in Azerbaijan with the final taking place on 28 May 1994.

First round

|}

Second round

|}

Round of 16

|}

Quarterfinals

|}

Semifinals

|}

Final

References

External links
Azerbaijan Cup
Azerbaijan Cup '93 RSSSF

Azerbaijan Cup seasons
Cup
Azerbaijan Cup